Mont-Carmel may refer to:

Mont-Carmel, Quebec
Mont-Carmel, Prince Edward Island

See also
Mount Carmel (disambiguation)